"Like a Star" is a song by Corinne Bailey Rae. 

Like a Star may also refer to:

"Like a Star", a song by Britt Nicole from The Lost Get Found
"Like a Star", a song by Reks from Rhythmatic Eternal King Supreme

See also
"She's like a Star", a 2008 song by Taio Cruz
Choose Something Like a Star (disambiguation)